Mungaoli Assembly constituency is one of the 230 Vidhan Sabha (Legislative Assembly) constituencies of Madhya Pradesh state in central India. This constituency came into existence in 1951, as one of the 79 Vidhan Sabha constituencies of the erstwhile Madhya Bharat state.

Overview
Mungaoli (constituency number 34) is one of the 3 Vidhan Sabha constituencies located in Ashok Nagar district. This constituency presently covers the entire Mungaoli tehsil and part of Chanderi tehsil of the district.

Mungaoli is part of Guna Lok Sabha constituency along with seven other Vidhan Sabha segments, namely, Chanderi and Ashok Nagar in this district, Bamori and in Guna in Guna district, Shivpuri, Pichhore and Kolaras in Shivpuri district.

Members of Legislative Assembly
As a constituency of Madhya Bharat:
 1951: Kundanlal Madanlal, Indian National Congress
As a constituency of Madhya Pradesh:
 1957: Khalak Singh Yadav, Hindu Mahasabha
 1962: Chandrabhan Singh, Praja Socialist Party
 1967: Chandan Singh Yadav, Swatantra Party
 1972: Gajram Singh Yadav, Bharatiya Jana Sangh
 1977: Chandramohan Rawat, Janata Party
 1980: Gajram Singh Yadav, Indian National Congress (I)
 1985: Gajram Singh Yadav, Indian National Congress (I)
 1990:  Rao Deshraj Singh Yadav, Bharatiya Janata Party
 1993: Anand Kumar Paliwal, Indian National Congress (I)
 1998: Rao Deshraj Singh Yadav, Bharatiya Janata Party
 2003: Gopal Singh Chauhan, Indian National Congress (I)
 2008: Rao Deshraj Singh Yadav, Bharatiya Janata Party
 2013: Mahendra singh Kalukheda, Indian National Congress (I)
2018(by-election): Brajendra Singh Yadav, INC
2018: Brajendra Singh Yadav, INC
2020(by-election): Brajendra Singh Yadav, BJP

See also
 Mungaoli

References

Ashoknagar district
Assembly constituencies of Madhya Pradesh